Scotia is a small settlement in north-west New South Wales, Australia, about  south of Broken Hill on the Silver City Highway. At the time of the 2021 census, Scotia had a population of 12 people.

Summer temperatures can reach .

Demographics
The median age of persons in Scotia was 61 years. There were less males than females, with 33.3% of the population male and 66.7% female. The average household size was 1.4 people per household.

Notes and references

Towns in New South Wales
Unincorporated Far West Region